Clavigera is a genus of moths in the family Sesiidae.

Species
Clavigera chrysoptera (Hampson, 1919)
Clavigera pugnax (Meyrick, 1926)

References

Sesiidae